Lady Justice is an allegorical personification of the moral force in judicial systems. Her attributes are scales, a sword and sometimes a blindfold. She often appears as a pair with Prudentia.

Lady Justice originates from the personification of Justice in Ancient Roman art known as Iustitia or Justitia, who is equivalent to the Greek goddess Dike.

The goddess Justitia
The origin of Lady Justice was Justitia (or Iustitia), the goddess of Justice within Roman mythology. Justitia was introduced by emperor Augustus, and was thus not a very old deity in the Roman pantheon. 

Justice was one of the virtues celebrated by emperor Augustus in his clipeus virtutis, and a temple of Iustitia was established in Rome by emperor Tiberius. Iustitia became a symbol for the virtue of justice with which every emperor wished to associate his regime; emperor Vespasian minted coins with the image of the goddess seated on a throne called Iustitia Augusta, and many emperors after him used the image of the goddess to proclaim themselves protectors of justice.  

Though formally called a goddess with her own temple and cult shrine in Rome, it appears that she was from the onset viewed more as an artistic symbolic personification rather than as an actual deity with religious significance.

Depiction

The personification of justice balancing the scales dates back to the goddess Maat, and later Isis, of ancient Egypt. The Hellenic deities Themis and Dike were later goddesses of justice. Themis was the embodiment of divine order, law, and custom, in her aspect as the personification of the divine rightness of law.

Scales

Lady Justice is most often depicted with a set of scales typically suspended from one hand, upon which she balances the act and consequences of the act to achieve equilibrium and, therefore, justice.

The Greek goddess Dike is depicted holding a set of scales:

Blindfold

Since the 16th century, Lady Justice has often been depicted wearing a blindfold. The blindfold was originally a satirical addition intended to show justice as blind to the injustice carried on before her,  but it has been reinterpreted over time and is now understood to represent impartiality, the ideal that justice should be applied without regard to wealth, power, or other status. The earliest Roman coins depicted Justitia with the sword in one hand and the scale in the other, but with her eyes uncovered.<ref>See "The Scales of Justice as Represented in Engravings, Emblems, Reliefs and Sculptures of Early Modern Europe" in G. Lamoine, ed., Images et representations de la justice du XVie au XIXe siècle (Toulouse: University of Toulose-Le Mirail, 1983)" at page 8.</ref>  Justitia was only commonly represented as "blind" since the middle of the 16th century. The first known representation of blind Justice is Hans Gieng's 1543 statue on the Gerechtigkeitsbrunnen (Fountain of Justice) in Bern.

Instead of using the Janus approach, many sculptures simply leave out the blindfold altogether.  For example, atop the Old Bailey courthouse in London, a statue of Lady Justice stands without a blindfold; the courthouse brochures explain that this is because Lady Justice was originally not blindfolded, and because her "maidenly form" is supposed to guarantee her impartiality which renders the blindfold redundant.  Another variation is to depict a blindfolded Lady Justice as a human scale, weighing competing claims in each hand. An example of this can be seen at the Shelby County Courthouse in Memphis, Tennessee.

Sword
The sword represented authority in ancient times, and conveys the idea that justice can be swift and final.

Toga
The Greco-Roman garment symbolizes the status of the philosophical attitude that embodies justice.

In computer systems

Unicode version 4.1.0 implemented a scales symbol at code point U+2696, that may be used to represent the scales of justice.

In art
Sculpture

Painting

Heraldry
Lady Justice and her symbols are used in heraldry, especially in the arms and seals of legal government agencies.

See also
Goddesses of Justice and related concepts
 (Goddesses of Justice): Astraea, Dike, Themis, Eunomia, Prudentia, Praxidice
 (Goddesses of Injustice): Adikia
 (Aspects of Justice):
 (Justice) Themis/Dike/Eunomia/Justitia (Lady Justice), Raguel (the Angel of Justice)
 (Retribution) Nemesis/Rhamnousia/Rhamnusia/Adrasteia/Adrestia/Invidia
 (Redemption) Eleos/Soteria/Clementia, Zadkiel/Zachariel (the Angel of Mercy)
 Durga, Hindu goddess of justice
 Lady Luck
 Lady Liberty

Gods of Justice
 Yama and Chitragupta duo

Astronomy
 5 Astraea, 24 Themis, 99 Dike and 269 Justitia, main belt asteroids all named for Astraea, Themis, Dike and Justitia, Classical goddesses of justice. 

Notable programs
 "Operation Lady Justice (Presidential Task Force on Missing and Murdered American Indians and Alaska Natives)

In fiction
 Judge Anderson, a female fictional law enforcer and psychic appearing in the British science fiction comics 2000 AD and the Judge Dredd Megazine.

 In popular culture 

 Metallica, a popular American heavy metal band, used an illustrated depiction of a cracked, rope-bound Lady Justice for their studio album ...And Justice for All''.

References

External links 

 DOJ Seal - History and Motto 
 

Justice goddesses
Personifications in Roman mythology
Roman goddesses
Heraldic charges